Walgaon is a town in Amravati district in the Indian state of Maharashtra. Samadhi of Gadge Maharaj is located near this town.

Its Coordinates are: Coordinates: 20°59'56"N   77°42'23"E . and is located on Maharashtra Major State Highway 6 and is located between Amravati and Paratwada city.

Before the delimitation of the constituency in 2008, Walgaon was constituency number 123 of Maharashtra Legislative Assembly between 1977-2004.

References

Cities and towns in Amravati district
Amravati district